Flat Creek is a stream in Georgia, and is a tributary of the Chattahoochee River in Lake Lanier.

Course

Flat Creek rises in Gainesville, Georgia in Hall County, just north of Lee Gilmer Memorial Airport, and immediately west of State Route 60. The creek heads in a westerly direction, and crosses State Route 13/State Route 53 within a few hundred yards, then curves to the southwest, paralleling State Route 369 to its north. Just east of McEver Road, Flat Creek turns to the south, then back to the west to cross McEver Road, and flows into Lake Lanier in the Flat Creek arm of the lake, which is separated from the Chattahoochee River arm by a peninsula which is bisected by State Route 369, and which is accessed by Browns Bridge coming from Forsyth County.

Sub-watershed details
The creek watershed and associated waters is designated by the United States Geological Survey as sub-watershed HUC 031300010802, is named the Flat Creek sub-watershed, and drains an area of approximately 21 square miles southwest of Gainesville. Flat Creek drains the northern portion of this watershed, while the southern portion around the community of Oakwood is drained by Balus Creek, which flows into Lake Lanier south of the Flat Creek arm of the lake.

See also
 Water Resource Region
 South Atlantic-Gulf Water Resource Region
 Apalachicola basin

References 

Flat Creek (Lake Lanier)
Rivers of Hall County, Georgia